Sharon Kleinbaum (born 1959) is an American rabbi who serves as spiritual leader of New York City's Congregation Beit Simchat Torah. She has been an active campaigner for human rights and civil marriage for gay couples.

On July 30, 2021, President Biden announced plans to appoint Kleinbaum to the United States Commission on International Religious Freedom; presidential appointments to the commission do not require congressional approval.

Early life and education 
Kleinbaum was born and raised in Rutherford, New Jersey. She is a 1977 graduate of the Frisch School and graduated, cum laude, from Barnard College with a degree in political science in 1981. While at Barnard College, she led protests against Barnard's investments in South Africa and against the proliferation of nuclear weapons. She is openly lesbian and has two daughters. She received her ordination from the Reconstructionist Rabbinical College in 1990. Kleinbaum has also studied at the Hebrew University of Jerusalem and at the Oxford Centre for Hebrew and Jewish Studies. She is a member of the Central Conference of American Rabbis and the Reconstructionist Rabbinical Association.

Career
Kleinbaum was installed as CBST's first rabbi in 1992. She is a prominent advocate for human rights.

In 1995, Kleinbaum, along with Rabbi Margaret Wenig and Russell Pearce, sent a resolution asking for support for civil marriage for gay couples to the Reform movement's Commission on Social Action; when it was approved by them, Wenig submitted it to the Central Conference of American Rabbis, which approved it in 1996.

Kleinbaum served on Mayor Bloomberg's Commission on Lesbian, Gay, Bisexual, Transgender and Questioning (LGBTQ) Runaway and Homeless Youth and New York Police Department's LGBT Advisory Committee (2009-2010). Kleinbaum has also served on Mayor de Blasio's Transition Committee (2013–2014), and the U.S. Department of State's Religion and Foreign Policy Working Group Sub-working Group on Social Justice (2014). Appointed by Senator Chuck Schumer, she served as a commissioner for the United States Commission on International Religious Freedom from 2019 to 2020. She also serves on New York City's Commission on Human Rights, Mayor de Blasio's Faith Based Advisory Council, the board of New York Jewish Agenda, the New Sanctuary Coalition of New York, and is on the board of the New Israel Fund (NIF).

Personal life 
She married Rabbi Margaret Wenig in 2008, though they later divorced. Kleinbaum married Randi Weingarten on March 25, 2018.

Awards 
Kleinbaum was named one of the 50 most influential rabbis in America by Newsweek for several years, as well as one of Newsweek's 150 Women Who Shake the World. She was also named one of the Top 10 Women Religious Leaders and one of the 15 Inspiring LGBT Religious Leaders by the Huffington Post. She has also been named one of the country's top 50 Jewish leaders by the Forward  and the New York Jewish Week, as well as being named one of Forward's Sisterhood 50 American Influential Rabbis and AM New York named her one of New York City's Most Influential Women for Women's Day. Kleinbaum is a recipient of the Jewish Fund for Justice Woman of Valor Award. Other awards she has received include:

  New York City Comptroller Elizabeth Holtzman's award for her leadership and courage in the fight for lesbian and gay rights.
  Hetrick-Martin Emery Award, 1996.
  Reconstructionist Rabbinical College Board of Governors Award, 1997.
  New York City Comptroller Alan G. Hevesi's award for her leadership and dedication to safeguarding the rights of lesbians and gay men, 1998.
  Jewish Fund for Justice's "Woman of Valor", 2000.
  The Lavender Light: Black and People of All Colors, Lesbian and Gay Gospel Choir Warriors of Faith Award, 2006.
  Grand Marshal for Heritage of Pride Gay Pride March, 2007.
  LGBT Center's Women's Event Community Leader Award, 2009.
  The Reconstructionist Rabbinical College's Keter Shem Tov Award, 2012.
  Jews For Racial and Economic Justice's (JFREJ's) Rabbi Marshall T. Meyer Risk Taker Award, 2014.
  The Parity Award: Lifetime of Activism and Leadership, 2016.
  The Islamic Center at New York University: Visionary Award, 2017. 
  The Auburn Seminary Lives of Commitment Award, 2017.
  Muslim Community Network 2018.

Articles and books 
 No Time for Neutrality: American Rabbinic Voices from an Era of Upheaval by Michael Rose Knopf (Author), Miriam Aniel (Editor), Dean Whitbeck (Illustrator), Art Green (Preface), Jill Jacobs (Foreword) (October 5, 2021)
Chaver Up!: 49 Rabbis Explore What it Means to be an Ally through a Jewish Lens'''' by Rabbi Mike Moskowitz (Author), Rabbi Sharon Kleinbaum (Editor), (Congregation Beit Simchat Torah, March 24, 2021).
"The Work of Repairing the World: Resilience and Failing (in Order) to Succeed", Moral Resistance and Spiritual Authority: Our Jewish Obligation to Social Justice (Central Conference of American Rabbis, 2019).
 “When Is Our Reichstag Fire Coming, And Will We Be Prepared For It?” by Rabbi Sharon Kleinbaum, Huffington Post, March 1, 2017.
 "Post Election Sermon", WHAT WE DO NOW: Standing Up for Your Values in Trump's America (Melville House, January 2017)
 Foreword: Changing Lives, Making History: Congregation Beit Simchat Torah (Congregation Beit Simchat Torah, 2014).
 Editor: Siddur B'chol L'vav'cha (Congregation Beit Simchat Torah, 2007).
 Listening for the Oboe (Congregation Beth Simchat Torah, 2005).
 Synagogue as Spiritual Community (Congregation Beth Simchat Torah, 2001).
 "Bully Me" in It Gets Better: Coming Out, Overcoming Bullying, and Creating a Life Worth Living, edited by Dan Savage and Terry Miller, Dutton Adult (March 22, 2011).
 "Do Not Hold Back: Notes from a Gay Congregation" by Rabbi Sharon Kleinbaum, Tikkun, p. 51, Winter 2011.
 "Supporting Our Muslim Neighbors in the New Year" by Rabbi Sharon Kleinbaum, Gay City News, September 15, 2010.
 "Signs of Faith, 'God Hates Hate'" by Rabbi Sharon Kleinbaum, The Advocate.com, June 25, 2009.
 "Overcoming Prejudice" in Conscience 27. (2006).
 "What Now? After the Exodus, the Wilderness" from Women's Passover Companion: Women's Reflections on the Festival of Freedom edited by Rabbi Sharon Cohen Anisfeld, Tara Mohr and Catherine Spector, Jewish Lights Pub; (February 2003).
 Essay in Rabbis: The Many Faces of Judaism: 100 Unexpected Photographs of Rabbis With Essays in Their Own Words (Universe Publishing 2002).
 "There's a Place for Us: Gays and Lesbians in the Jewish Community" by Rabbis Sharon A. Kleinbaum and Rabbi Margaret Moers Wenig, Life Lights (Jewish Lights Publishing, 2002).
 "Gay and Lesbian Synagogue as Spiritual Community" in the anthology Lesbian Rabbis: The First Generation edited by Rebecca R. Alpert, Sue Levi Elwell and Shirley Idelson (Rutgers University Press 2001).
 "Memo to Clinton: Gays and Lesbians", Rabbi Sharon Kleinbaum, Tikkun Magazine, Vol. 8, January 1993.
 "An Eye for an Eye, A Tooth for a Tooth" in Reconstructionist Autumn 1992.
 "Responses to the Destruction: A Look at Some Rabbinic Texts" in Reconstructionist July–August 1990.

 Filmography 
Films that Rabbi Kleinbaum is featured in
 Everything Relative (1996) written and directed by Sharon Pollock.
 Ruthie and Connie: Every Room in the House (2002) Directed by Deborah Dickson. With Ruthie Berman and Connie Kurtz.
 Jerusalem is Proud to Present (2008) A film by Nitzan Gilady, Producer: Galia Bador.
 Grace Paley: Collected Shorts (2009) A film by Lilly Rivlin.

 References 

 Further reading 
 Changing Lives, [https://web.archive.org/web/20141129124206/http://www.cbstbook.com/welcome/ Making History: Congregation Beit Simchat Torah by Rabbi Ayelet S. Cohen, Congregation Beit Simchat Torah (2014)] .
 The L Life: Extraordinary Lesbians making a Difference by Erin McHugh, photographs by Jennifer May, Stewart, Tabori and Chang (2011).
 "Liberation through Religion: A Conversation with Rabbi Sharon Kleinbaum" by Rebecca Steinitz, Arcus Foundation, October 15, 2010.
 Travels in A Gay Nation: Portraits of LGBTQ Americans by Philip Gambone, University of Wisconsin Press (2010).
 Lawyers' Ethics and the Pursuit of Social Justice: A Critical Reader (Critical America) (New York University Press 2005).
 Outwitting History: The Amazing Adventures of A Man Who Rescued A Million Yiddish Books (Algonquin Books 2004).
 The Many Faces of God: A Reader of Modern Jewish Theologies (URJ Press 2004).
 From Abyssinian to Zion: A Guide to Manhattan's Houses of Worship (Columbia University Press 2004).
 The Quotable Jewish Woman: Wisdom, Inspiration, & Humor from the Mind and Heart (Jewish Lights Publishing 2004).
 His Brother's Keeper: 50 Years of the American Jewish Society for Service, by Paul Milkman, Global Publications (2001).
 Lesbian Rabbis: The First Generation edited by Rebecca R. Alpert, Sue Levi Elwell and Shirley Idelson (Rutgers University Press 2001).
 The Journey Home: Jewish Women and the American Century by Joyce Antler (Free Press 1997).
 Chapter 7 "From Exile to Homecoming" Taking Judaism Personally: Creating a Meaningful Spiritual Life by Judy Petsonk, Free Press (1996).
 "Western Ideas About Death Chronology Part 7", Rabbi Sharon Kleinbaum", All of Us: Americans Talk About the Meaning of Death, by Patricia Anderson, Delacorte Press (1996).
 "Part 2: A Death in the Family: AIDS Related Deaths" Interview with Rabbi Sharon Kleinbaum, A Time to Mourn, A Time to Comfort, by Dr. Ron Wolfson, The Federation of Jewish Men's Clubs (1993).
 A Gay Synagogue in New York'' by Moshe Shokeid Columbia University Press (1995).

External links 
 The Ties that Bind: A Conversation with Bishop Gene Robinson and Rabbi Sharon Kleinbaum Ties that Bind, In The Life, January 2009
 Rabbi Kleinbaum's Message to LGBTQ Youth

1959 births
Living people
21st-century American rabbis
21st-century American women writers
American Reconstructionist rabbis
Barnard College alumni
Frisch School alumni
Lesbian feminists
American lesbian writers
Reconstructionist women rabbis
LGBT rabbis
LGBT people from New York (state)
Jewish American writers
Jewish women writers
American feminists
Reconstructionist Jewish feminists
People from Rutherford, New Jersey